Bruno Kuzuhara defeated Jakub Menšík in the final, 7–6(7–4), 6–7(6–8), 7–5 to win the boys' singles title at the 2022 Australian Open.

Harold Mayot was the defending champion but was no longer eligible to participate in junior events. Mayot competed at the men's singles qualifying event, where he was defeated in the first round by Quentin Halys.

Seeds

Draw

Finals

Top half

Section 1

Section 2

Bottom half

Section 3

Section 4

Qualifying

Seeds

Qualifiers

Draw

First qualifier

Second qualifier

Third qualifier

Fourth qualifier

Fifth qualifier

Sixth qualifier

Seventh qualifier

Eighth qualifier

References

External links 
 Draw at itftennis.com
 Draw at ausopen.com

2022
Boys' Singles